Picture lock is a stage in editing a film or editing a television production. It is the stage prior to online editing when all changes to the film or television program cut have been done and approved. It is then sent to subsequent stages in the process, such as online editing and audio mixing. Any last-minute changes can force portions of subsequent work to be redone.

References 

Film and video terminology

de:Picture lock